Huo Cui (born 13 September 1988) is a Chinese ice hockey player and former member of the Chinese national team. She most recently played with the KRS Vanke Rays in the 2020–21 season of the Zhenskaya Hockey League (ZhHL). Huo represented China in the women's ice hockey tournament at the 2010 Winter Olympic Games and at a number of other international events.

References

External links 
 
 
 
 

1988 births
Living people
Chinese women's ice hockey players
Sportspeople from Harbin
Shenzhen KRS Vanke Rays players
Ice hockey players at the 2010 Winter Olympics
Olympic ice hockey players of China
Asian Games medalists in ice hockey
Ice hockey players at the 2011 Asian Winter Games
Medalists at the 2011 Asian Winter Games
Asian Games bronze medalists for China